Forgotten is a three-part British television drama series, created and written by playwright Caleb Ranson, that first broadcast on ITV on 15 February 1999. The series stars Paul McGann and Amanda Burton, and follows Ben Turner (McGann), a happily-married father to a six-year-old daughter, whose life is turned upside down by the arrival of a letter in the mail, whose writer claims to have information relating to his involvement in a murder several years earlier. Events are further complicated when Rachel Monroe (Burton), the mother of the victim, arrives at Turner's bed & breakfast in an attempt to discover the truth behind the crime.

The series broadcast over three consecutive nights, with the concluding episodes following on 22 February and 1 March 1999. The first episode drew 12 million viewers, while the second attracted 11.2 million, and the final episode attracted 11.9 million. The series aired as part of PBS' Mystery! strand in the United States, and was released on Region 1 DVD on 2 October 2001; however, this title is now out of print. The series is yet to be released on Region 2 DVD.

Production
Amanda Burton, when interviewed by PBS regarding her role as Rachel Monroe, commented: "Rachel can be mischievous... I must admit that it's nice being a bit wicked or devilish as Rachel."

Reception
Larisa Lomacky Moore for Amazon.com wrote; "The end is guaranteed to surprise and disturb even the most astute armchair detective."

Cast

 Paul McGann as Ben Turner 
 Amanda Burton as Rachel Monroe 
 Zara Turner as Natalie Turner 
 Karis Copp as Emmy Turner 
 Kathryn Howden as DCI Parris
 Tim Faraday as DS Harding 
 Ian Hogg as Ch. Supt. Dexter Alan 
 Adrian Rawlins as Oliver Fraser 
 Geraldine Alexander as Stella Cannon 
 Christopher Villiers as Andrew Cannon
 Gwyneth Strong as Denise Longden
 Mark Bagnall as Robin 
 Lloyd McGuire as Ed 
 Anna Keaveney as Eileen 
 Edward Jewesbury as Bernard Clivedon 
 Liz Edmiston as Alma Todd 
 Sally Faulkner as Mrs. Arthur

Episodes

References

External links

1999 British television series debuts
1999 British television series endings
1990s British crime drama television series
1990s British television miniseries
ITV television dramas
Television series by ITV Studios
London Weekend Television shows
English-language television shows
Television shows set in England